The 2021 Ligier European Series was the second season of the Ligier European Series. The six-event season began at Circuit de Barcelona-Catalunya on 16 April, and finished at Algarve International Circuit on 23 October.

Calendar

Entries

Teams and drivers

Results
Bold indicates overall winner.

Championships

JS P4 Drivers

JS2 R Drivers

JS P4 Teams

JS2 R Teams

References

External links
 

Ligier European Series
Ligier European Series
Ligier European Series